is a private university in Shiojiri, Nagano, Japan, established in 1972. It has a 6-year dental program, a 3-year dental hygiene program, and a graduate school of dentistry.

External links
 Official website 
 Official website 

Educational institutions established in 1972
Private universities and colleges in Japan
Universities and colleges in Nagano Prefecture
Dental schools in Japan
1972 establishments in Japan
Shiojiri, Nagano